Division No. 3, Newfoundland and Labrador is a census division in the Canadian province of Newfoundland and Labrador, primarily comprising the South Coast of the island of Newfoundland, starting roughly 10km northwest of Channel-Port aux Basques and ending roughly 10km east of Rencontre East. Like all census divisions in Newfoundland and Labrador, but unlike the census divisions of some other provinces, the division exists only as a statistical division for census data, and is not a political entity.

In the Canada 2021 Census, the division had a population of 13,920 (down from 15,560 in 2016) and a land area of 19,912.67 square kilometres.

Towns

Unorganized subdivisions
 Subdivision A
 Subdivision B
 Subdivision C
 Subdivision D
 Subdivision E
 Subdivision F
 Subdivision H
 Subdivision I
 Subdivision J

First Nations reserves
 Samiajij Miawpukek

Demographics

See also
List of communities in Newfoundland and Labrador

References

External links
 

003